The Levensau High Bridge (short: Levensauer Hochbrücke) is a high level arch bridge that spans the Kiel Canal in the German state of Schleswig-Holstein. Built in 1894 it is the oldest bridge crossing the Kiel Canal. A second bridge nearby, opened 1984, is referred to as Levensau Motorway Bridge (German: Levensauer Schnellstraßenbrücke).

Previous history 
The lower section of the small river Levensau was extended between 1777 and 1784 to become part of the Eider Canal. Between 1887 and 1895 the Eider Canal was further extended and straightened to become part of the Kiel Canal (then Kaiser-Wilhelm-Kanal). The extended canal necessitated a fixed link for the Kiel–Flensburg railway as well as the principal road from Kiel to Eckernförde.

Historic picturesBeing a landmark on the Kiel canal, the bridge was depicted on postcards and also used as a popular background for pictures of ships transiting the canal.

Design and construction
Construction of the bridge took 1 years. Work on the abutments was started in June 1893 and bricklaying lasted until end of that year. On top of the abutments the bridge featured four towers by architect Hermann Muthesius. The scaffolding that supported the steel elements during construction was erected from November 1893 and assembly of the steel construction started in May 1894. The bridge was inaugurated by Emperor Wilhelm II in December 1894.
Originally the carriageway was designed in such a way that it could not be used by road and rail traffic simultaneously - if a train approached, the bridge was closed for cars and lorries. In the course of a first modification a barrier between road and railway was installed, however this limited the width of the road to  so that lorries were unable to pass each other on the bridge.
In 1954, the bridge was extensively reworked to allow for independent use by road, rail and pedestrians. The towers were torn down and the  carriageway was enlarged.

Replacement
In 1984 a four lane road bridge was opened for road traffic, taking over the role as main canal crossing for the Kiel–Schleswig road (route 76).

The current bridge is still used for the railway and local road traffic including bicycles. In 2009 the cost estimate for the replacement stood at 42 million Euros.
The replacement of the old bridge with a substitute was decided in 2018. The replacement was also deemed necessary due to technical reasons. However, in addition to taking the geological condition of the subsoil into consideration the project also has to respect environmental aspects (for instance the presence of bats). 
The project itself with a number of illustrations and some information in English is presented by its engineers.
There is also a direct webcam displaying the bridge and the current construction zone.

Bat habitat 
Inside the old brick abutments a mixed colony of roughly 5,000 hibernate. The colony is protected under the Convention on International Trade in Endangered Species of Wild Fauna and Flora, CITES, and includes Microbats, Common nocturles, Daubenton bats
and Natterer bats. The population was examined by scientists of the Kiel University and is considered the largest in Northern Europe.

Gallery
Contemporary picturesThe Levensau Motorway Bridge, built in 1984, can be seen on some of the newer pictures

References

Railway bridges in Germany
Buildings and structures in Schleswig-Holstein
Kiel Canal